Ammar Malik (born June 22, 1987) is an American songwriter. He has co-written several modern pop songs, most notably Maroon 5's "Moves like Jagger" and Gym Class Heroes' "Stereo Hearts" which have both been certified multi-platinum by the RIAA. He tied for 17th place in Songtrust's publication of the top 20 songwriters of 2011. Ammar Malik's songs have sold over 100 million copies worldwide in total.

Life and career

Early life
Ammar Malik is a first-generation American born to Pakistani parents in Northern Virginia. He first started learning guitar when he was 14. As a high school and college student he wrote and performed music locally with several different bands.  Malik attended George Mason University as an English major.

Songwriting
Malik's close friend and co-manager David Silberstein had a childhood connection to producer Benny Blanco along with his brother and now co-manager Jeremy Levin.  After Malik and Blanco were introduced, Blanco suggested he try his hand at writing songs for other artists. Though Malik had intentions of being an artist himself, when nearing the end of college he decided to give it a shot.  In an interview Malik said that two of his biggest influences are Radiohead and Rx Bandits. He also co-wrote "Compass" by Lady Antebellum in 2013's single.

In 2013 Malik won the coveted BMI Pop Songwriter of the Year title, along with Benny Blanco, and Claude Kelly. Each contributed four songs to the year's most performed list. Malik co-penned "Ass Back Home", "Moves Like Jagger, "Payphone" and "Stereo Hearts". Benny Blanco, Adam Levine and Ammar Malik also clinched BMI Pop Song of the Year honors for their co-write of "Moves Like Jagger".

Songwriting discography

References

1987 births
American people of Pakistani descent
Living people
Oakton High School alumni
Songwriters from Virginia